Francis Allen "Red" Synott (December 28, 1890 – October 12, 1945) was a Canadian-born American ice hockey star of the early 1920s, playing on the first two United States hockey teams, and winning silver medals with them in 1920 and 1924. Besides the Olympics, he won a world championship with the U.S. in 1920.

Synott also played for Boston A.A. for a brief period (1919–1920).

References

External links
 

1890 births
1945 deaths
American ice hockey officials
American men's ice hockey players
American people of Canadian descent
Boston Athletic Association ice hockey players
Ice hockey people from New Brunswick
Ice hockey players at the 1920 Summer Olympics
Ice hockey players at the 1924 Winter Olympics
Medalists at the 1920 Summer Olympics
Medalists at the 1924 Winter Olympics
Olympic silver medalists for the United States in ice hockey
People from Miramichi, New Brunswick